The Grove, also known as Blount-Bridgers House, is a historic home located at Tarboro, Edgecombe County, North Carolina. It was built about 1808, and is a two-story, five bay, Federal style frame dwelling.  It has a gable roof and pairs of double-shouldered brick end chimneys.  It was the home of Thomas Blount (1759–1812), an American Revolutionary War veteran and statesman.

It was listed on the National Register of Historic Places in 1971. It is located in the Tarboro Historic District.

Edgecombe Arts is located in the Blount-Bridgers House, which features a permanent collection of works by Tarboro-born artist Hobson Pittman (1899–1972), including oil paintings, pastels, drawings, prints and watercolors.  Blount-Bridgers House also exhibits locally-made period furniture and 19th-century paintings  as well as works by Thomas Sully, Thomas Landseer and William Garle Brown. The area also changing exhibits of contemporary artists.

References

External links
 Edgecombe Arts – official site

Houses on the National Register of Historic Places in North Carolina
Federal architecture in North Carolina
Houses completed in 1808
Houses in Edgecombe County, North Carolina
National Register of Historic Places in Edgecombe County, North Carolina
Museums in Edgecombe County, North Carolina
Art museums and galleries in North Carolina
Historic house museums in North Carolina
Individually listed contributing properties to historic districts on the National Register in North Carolina